Jake Elwes is a British media artist. Their practice is the exploration of artificial intelligence (AI), queer theory and technical biases. They are known for using AI to create art in mediums such as video, performance and installation. Their work on queering technology addresses issues caused by the normative biases of artificial intelligence.

Education and early life 
Elwes (pronounced "El-wez") was born in London to Anneke and Luke Elwes a British contemporary artist and painter.
They studied at the Slade School of Fine Art from 2013 to 2017, where they began using computer code as a medium.
In 2016 they attended the School of Machines, Making & Make-Believe in Berlin with artist and educator Gene Kogan.
Elwes was introduced to drag performance by Dr Joe Parslow who holds a Phd in drag performance; drag performance has since become instrumental to Elwes' work.

Career 

Elwes' work with artificial intelligence is cited as a hopeful strategy to make AI more playful and diverse. They were a 2021 finalist for the Lumen Prize, and received the Honorary Mention of the 2022 Prix Ars Electronica in the Interactive Art + category. They have exhibited in museums and galleries in Europe and Asia including Gazelli Art House, Arebyte gallery, ZKM, the Onassis Foundation, Zabludowicz Foundation, AIIIII Art Center, Today Art Museum, and the Victoria and Albert Museum.

Installations projecting conversations between two neural networks 
Elwes has created works based on the conversations between two neural networks including Closed Loop from 2017 and Auto-Encoded Buddha from 2016.  In Auto-Encoded Buddha, a computer struggles with the notion of Buddha's philosophy. This is Elwes' tribute to Nam June Paik's TV Buddha (1974).

The Zizi Project - a deepfake drag cabaret 

The Zizi Project is a series of works that explore the interaction of drag and A.I. Currently, Zizi is made up of three projects.

Zizi - Queering the Dataset (2019) 
Knowing that facial recognition technology statically struggle to recognize black women or transgender people, Elwes set out to "Queer the Dataset"  through an open-sourced generative adversarial network (GAN). Elwes added a dataset of 1,000 photos of drag kings and queens into the GAN's 70,000 faces collected in a dataset called Flickr-Faces-HQ Dataset (FFHQ).  They then created new simulacra faces, known as deep fakes.

Zizi & Me (2020) 
Zizi & Me is a performance and video installation that shows a joint performance between drag queen 'Me The Drag Queen' and her deepfake A.I. clone.

The Zizi Show (2020) 
The Zizi Show is a deep fake drag act based on artificial intelligence (AI). It has been presented live and as interactive online artwork.  It is an exploration of queer culture and the algorithms philosophy and ethics of AI.  The work questions if AI can be used to explore and celebrate queer identities. The avatars within Zizi are deepfakes that playfully exaggerates the human form. They are generated by a hacked artificial intelligence (AI) system. They were made to challenge the biases that have been built into many of the most commonly used facial recognition technologies.

CUSP 

In their video work CUSP (2019) Elwes places marsh birds generated using artificial intelligence into a tidal landscape. These digitally generated and constantly shifting birds are recorded in dialogue with native birds. The video work is also accompanied by a soundscape of artificially generated bird song.

References

21st-century British artists
Living people
Alumni of the Slade School of Fine Art
Alumni of Central Saint Martins
Artificial intelligence art
British digital artists
1993 births
British LGBT artists
British multimedia artists